Metabolic Brain Disease is a quarterly peer-reviewed medical journal covering the study of metabolic brain diseases. It was established in 1986 and is published by Springer Science+Business Media. The editor-in-chief is Gregory W. Konat (West Virginia University). According to the Journal Citation Reports, the journal has a 2021 impact factor of 3.655.

References

External links

Neurology journals
Springer Science+Business Media academic journals
Publications established in 1986
Quarterly journals
English-language journals